The 1965 Los Angeles Rams season was the team's 28th year with the National Football League and the 20th season in Los Angeles. This season saw the Rams attempting to improve on their 5-7-2 record from 1964 and snap a streak of 6 straight losing seasons. The Rams opened the season against the Detroit Lions and lost 20-0 in Detroit. However, the Rams were able to bounce back and beat the Chicago Bears in their home opener by a score of 30-28. But after the Bears win, the Rams began to choke, as they lost their next 8 games and fell out of tournament contention. After 3 straight wins against the Packers, Cardinals and Browns, the Rams lost to the Colts by a score of 20-17 at home and finished 4-10.

Schedule

Standings

References

Los Angeles Rams
Los Angeles Rams seasons
Los Angeles Rams